The Jeff Davis County School District is a public school district in Jeff Davis County, Georgia, United States, based in Hazlehurst. It serves the communities of Denton and Hazlehurst.

Schools
The school district has two elementary schools, one middle school, and one high school.

Elementary schools
Jeff Davis Elementary School
Jeff Davis Primary School

Middle school
Jeff Davis Middle School

High school
Jeff Davis High School

References

External links

School districts in Georgia (U.S. state)
Education in Jeff Davis County, Georgia